The Wilhelm Pelster House-Barn, also known as the Pelster-Panhorst House-Barn, is a historic home and barn located near New Haven, Franklin County, Missouri. It was built by German immigrant Wilhelm Pelster between about 1860 and 1864, and is a combined house and barn of Fachwerk construction.  The banked half-timbered and masonry building has four interior levels and measures approximately 60 feet wide by 53 feet deep.

It was listed on the National Register of Historic Places in 1978.

References

Houses on the National Register of Historic Places in Missouri
Barns on the National Register of Historic Places in Missouri
Houses completed in 1864
Buildings and structures in Franklin County, Missouri
National Register of Historic Places in Franklin County, Missouri